The 1989 All-Ireland Minor Football Championship was the 58th staging of the All-Ireland Minor Football Championship, the Gaelic Athletic Association's premier inter-county Gaelic football tournament for boys under the age of 18.

Kerry entered the championship as defending champions, however, they were defeated by Offaly in the All-Ireland semi-final.

On 17 September 1989, Derry won the championship following a 3-9 to 1-6 defeat of Offaly in the All-Ireland final. This was their third All-Ireland title and their first title in six championship seasons.

Results

Connacht Minor Football Championship

Semi-Finals

Final

Leinster Minor Football Championship

Preliminary Round

Quarter-Finals

Semi-Finals

Final

Munster Minor Football Championship

Quarter-Final

Semi-Finals

Final

Ulster Minor Football Championship

Preliminary Round

Quarter-Finals

Semi-Finals

Final

All-Ireland Minor Football Championship

Semi-Finals

Final

Championship statistics

Miscellaneous

 Offaly win the Leinster Championship for the first time since 1965.

References

1989
All-Ireland Minor Football Championship